Villivakkam is a legislative assembly constituency in the Indian state of Tamil Nadu. Its State Assembly Constituency number is 14. It consists of a portion of Chennai and falls under Chennai Central Lok Sabha constituency. It is one of the 234 State Legislative Assembly Constituencies in Tamil Nadu, in India.

Members of Legislative Assembly

Overview
As per orders of the Delimitation Commission, No. 14 Villivakkam Assembly constituency is composed of Ward 55-58 & 63-64 of Greater Chennai Corporation

Election results

2021

2016

2011

2006

2001

1996

1991

1989

1984

1980

1977

References 

 

Assembly constituencies of Tamil Nadu
Politics of Chennai